The Man and the Moment is a formerly lost 1929 part-talkie romantic comedy film directed by George Fitzmaurice and starring Billie Dove. The film is mainly a silent film, with talking sequences as well as a synchronized music score and sound effects by the Vitaphone sound-on-disc process. In the restored print, many scenes feature intertitles shown immediately after the spoken dialogue conveying the same words.  Title cards at the beginning of the restored print explain that the visuals for the talking sequences came from a dupe internegative that was distributed in some territories in silent form; the intertitles were left in the sequences during the restoration to maintain synchronization with the Vitaphone soundtrack, but were not originally part of the film. The story is from a 1914 novel by Elinor Glyn, the famous novelist. The film was produced by Richard A. Rowland and released by First National Pictures. A British silent film had been film of the same story in 1918.

Plot
Two young people get married for the wrong reasons, and after being chased for a day, they decide they belong together.

Cast
Billie Dove as Joan
Rod La Rocque as Michel
Gwen Lee as Viola
Robert Schable as Skippy
Charles Sellon as Joan's Guardian
George Bunny as Butler

Preservation
A restored and complete version of the film was screened July 4, 2015 at the Il cinema ritrovato festival in Bologna, Italy. The film was released on DVD by Warner Home Video in 2016.

The film wasn’t included to the Associated Artists Productions' packages, as Warner Bros. is currently hold the distribution rights.

See also
The Man and the Moment (1918)
Mad Hour (1928)

References

External links
 

 DVD review of the recently restored The Man and the Moment

1929 films
1929 romantic comedy films
American romantic comedy films
American silent feature films
Films directed by George Fitzmaurice
Films based on British novels
Films about weddings
American black-and-white films
American remakes of British films
First National Pictures films
1920s rediscovered films
Rediscovered American films
1920s American films
Silent romantic comedy films
Silent American comedy films